The Definitive Collection is a compilation album by English rock band Whitesnake. Released in 2006, this album features most of the band's biggest hits on one CD. The song "Pride and Joy" is not a Whitesnake song, but rather a song by Coverdale•Page.

As of 2014 it has sold 104,846 copies in US.

Track listing
 "Don't Break My Heart Again" - 4:04	
 "Walking in the Shadow of the Blues" - 4:18	
 "Ain't No Love in the Heart of the City" - 5:05	
 "Ready an' Willing" - 3:14	
 "Slide It In" - 3:21	
 "Love Ain't No Stranger" - 4:14	
 "Slow an' Easy" - 6:10	
 "Fool for Your Loving '89" -	4:09	
 "Judgement Day" - 5:12	
 "The Deeper the Love" - 4:18	
 "Now You're Gone" - 4:08
 "Looking for Love" - 6:27	
 "Give Me All Your Love" - 3:27	
 "Is This Love" - 4:39	
 "Here I Go Again '87" - 4:32	
 "Still of the Night" - 6:37	
 "Pride and Joy" - 3:32	
 "We Wish You Well" - 1:34

References

External links
Official website

Whitesnake compilation albums
2006 compilation albums